Market in Honey Lane was an ATV British television weekly series, which switched to a twice weekly soap opera format (shown at varying times around the ITV regions) after the first year. It was broadcast between April 1967 and March 1969.

This cockney drama was set in an East London street market and covered the traders and customers. It was created by Louis Marks. According to www.lostshows.com 13 of the original 91 episodes are missing from the archives.

The main cast included:
John Bennett as Billy Bush
Michael Golden as Sam English
Ray Lonnen as Dave Sampson
Peter Birrel as Jacko Bennet
Brian Rawlinson as Danny Jessel
Pat Nye as Polly Jessel
Basil Henson as Seymour Darcy

Anna Wing also appeared. She would later find fame in the BBC soap EastEnders, which was also set in the East End of London. Market In Honey Lane was recorded at ATV Elstree, the same studio complex that is now home to EastEnders. Ray Lonnen would go on to star in another ATV soap, Crossroads, but in the Carlton Television produced Crossroads of 2001.

References

External links

British television soap operas
1967 British television series debuts
1969 British television series endings
1960s British television soap operas
Television shows set in London
ITV soap operas
Television series by ITV Studios
English-language television shows
Television shows produced by Associated Television (ATV)
Black-and-white British television shows
Television shows shot at ATV Elstree Studios